tackle box or tacklebox may refer to:

 Tackle box (fishing), a box designed for fishing equipment
 Tackle box (American football), the area between where the two offensive tackles line up prior to the snap
 Tacklebox, 2006 collection of multi-track demos by Ty Tabor
 Tacklebox (mixtape), the 2010 mixtape by Midwest rap duo The Cool Kids